Mafizur Rahman (born November 10, 1978, Madaripur) is a former Bangladeshi cricketer who played in 4 ODIs in 1997.

References

1978 births
Living people
Bangladesh One Day International cricketers
Bangladeshi cricketers
People from Madaripur District